A list of films produced by the Marathi language film industry based in Maharashtra in the year 1920.

1920 Releases
A list of Marathi films released in 1920.

References

External links
Gomolo - 

Lists of 1920 films by country or language
1920
1920 in Indian cinema